TDRA may represent:

 Telecommunications and Digital Government Regulatory Authority
 Trademark Dilution Revision Act
 Transitional Darfur Regional Authority
 Theory of dual radiation action